Biffen is a surname. Notable people with the surname include:

Charles Edward Biffen, fictional character in the short story The Rummy Affair of Old Biffy by P. G. Wodehouse
John Biffen, PC, DL (1930–2007), Conservative member of the UK House of Lords, after 36 years in the House of Commons
Rowland Biffen (1874–1949), British botanist, geneticist, mycologist, professor of agricultural botany at the University of Cambridge
Sarah Biffen (1784–1850), Victorian English painter born with no arms

See also
Biffen och Bananen (the Beef and the Banana), a comic strip by Rit-Ola, originally published in Folket i Bild, 1936–1978
Biffen Lecture, lectureship organised by the John Innes Centre, named after Rowland Biffen